Branislav Novaković (born 14 December 1958) is a Serbian football manager and former player.

Career
Novaković came through the youth system of Vojvodina, making his Yugoslav First League debut in the 1977–78 season. He amassed over 150 appearances in the top flight, before the club suffered relegation to the Yugoslav Second League in 1986. Later on, Novaković played for Vrbas in the Yugoslav Inter-Republic League.

In late 2004, Novaković briefly served as manager of Železnik, having previously been assistant to Mile Tomić.

References

External links
 

Association football midfielders
FK Spartak Subotica players
FK Vojvodina managers
FK Vojvodina players
FK Vrbas players
People from Novi Kneževac
Serbian football managers
Serbian footballers
Yugoslav First League players
Yugoslav footballers
1958 births
Living people